FMX – Conference on Animation, Effects, Games and Immersive Media is an event by Filmakademie’s Animationsinstitut. It takes place at Haus der Wirtschaft in Stuttgart every spring. FMX was originally founded for students in 1994 as the Film and Media Exchange.

History

FMX was originally founded for students in 1994 as the Film and Media Exchange. Today, it is run in co-operation with the Visual Effects Society and SIGGRAPH. In 2019 FMX welcomed around 4,000 visitors. Talks included presentations on Avengers: Endgame, Captain Marvel, Hellboy, Dumbo, Solo: A Star Wars Story, First Man and How to Train Your Dragon. FMX was described by Forbes magazine in January 2020 as one of the "global events getting immersive [entertainment] right"

APD
FMX runs alongside Animation Production Days, a business platform for the animation industry, bringing together financing, distribution and co-production partners for animation projects. APD also organise the APD talent program, in which young producers and recent graduates can submit projects at little or no cost.

FMX 2021
In 2021, FMX will host its first online edition, offering an entirely virtual conference program dedicated to the central theme "ReImagine Tomorrow".

Funding
FMX is supported financially by the Ministry of Science, Research and Arts and the Ministry of Economic Affairs, Labour and Housing of the State of Baden-Wuerttemberg, as well as the City of Stuttgart and also MFG Baden-Wuerttemberg.

See also 
 ACM SIGGRAPH
 VFX Festival

References

External links 
 FMX website

Computer graphics conferences
Recurring events established in 1994